South Brook may refer to:
South Brook (Mehoopany Creek)
South Brook, Nova Scotia
South Brook, Newfoundland and Labrador